Yuki Goto may refer to:

 Yuki Goto (singer, born 1986), Japanese YouTuber and former member of EE Jump
 Yuki Goto (singer, born 1993), Japanese former singer and member of Ciao Bella Cinquetti